The Glenbrook Native Plant Reserve is a small botanical garden and arboretum of around  in Glenbrook, New South Wales, Australia, featuring Australian native plants, principally those indigenous to the Blue Mountains. It contains a small nursery and education centre, as well as a small landscaped garden and the local flora reserve, with a number of walking trails and a wide range of local species represented.

It is tended by the Blue Mountains Branch of the Australian Plants Society.

External links
Australian National Botanic Gardens: Glenbrook Native Plant Reserve
Australian Plant Society Blue Mountains Group

Botanical gardens in New South Wales
Glenbrook, New South Wales